Alberto Tentardini (born 21 October 1996) is an Italian professional footballer who plays as a defender for  club Catanzaro.

Career
On 5 July 2017, he joined Monza.

On 23 July 2019, he signed a 2-year contract with Teramo.

On 6 July 2021, he moved to Catanzaro on a 2-year contract.

References

External links 

1996 births
Living people
Sportspeople from Como
Footballers from Lombardy
Italian footballers
Association football defenders
Serie B players
Serie C players
Como 1907 players
Calcio Padova players
A.C. Monza players
S.S. Teramo Calcio players
U.S. Catanzaro 1929 players